Air racing is a type of motorsport that involves airplanes or other types of aircraft that compete over a fixed course, with the winner either returning the shortest time, the one to complete it with the most points, or to come closest to a previously estimated time.

History
The first 'heavier-than-air' air race was held on 23 May 1909 - the Prix de Lagatinerie, at the Port-Aviation airport south of Paris, France.  Four pilots entered the race, two started, but nobody completed the full race distance; though this was not unexpected, as the rules specified that whoever travelled furthest would be the winner if no-one completed the race.  Léon Delagrange, who covered slightly more than half of the ten  laps was declared the winner.

Some other minor events were held before the Grande Semaine d'Aviation de la Champagne in 22–29 August 1909 at Reims, France.  This was the first major international flying event, drawing the most important aircraft makers and pilots of the era, as well as celebrities and royalty.  The premier event — the first Gordon Bennett Trophy competition — was won by Glenn Curtiss, who beat second-place finisher Louis Blériot by five seconds.  Curtiss was named 'Champion Air Racer of the World'.

The first air race in the United States was the 1910 Los Angeles International Air Meet at Dominguez Field, just south of Los Angeles, from 10 to 20 January 1910. The event was organised by pilots A. Roy Knabenshue and Charles Willard, who raised funding from railroad magnate Henry Huntington, and the Los Angeles Merchants and Manufacturers Association.  William Randolph Hearst carried coverage of the event in his Los Angeles Examiner, and hired a hot air balloon with a promotional parse touting his newspaper.  The event attracted 43 entrants, of which 16 appeared.  It was there that aviation pioneer and military pilot Jimmy Doolittle, then thirteen, saw his first airplane.

In the years before the First World War, popular interest in aviation led to a large number of air races in Europe; including the 1911 Circuit of Europe race, the Daily Mail Circuit of Britain Air Race, and the Aerial Derby.

In 1913, the first Schneider Trophy seaplane race was held.  When the competition was resumed after the war, it was significant in advancing aeroplane design, particularly in the fields of aerodynamics and engine design, and would show its results in the best fighters of World War II.

On 19 October 1919, the Army Transcontinental Air Race began along a  route from Long Island, New York to San Francisco, California, and back, which would see widespread carnage; including seven fatalities (two en route to the race).   Of the 48 aircraft that started, 33 would complete the double crossing of the continent.

In 1921, the United States instituted the National Air Meets, which became the National Air Races in 1924.  In 1929, the Women's Air Derby, nicknamed the 'Powder Puff Derby', became a part of the National Air Races circuit.  The National Air Races lasted until 1949.  The Cleveland Air Races was another important event.  In 1947, an All-Woman Transcontinental Air Race, also dubbed the Powder Puff Derby was established, running until 1977.

In 1934, the MacRobertson Air Race from England to Australia took place, with the winning de Havilland Comet flown by C. W. A. Scott and Tom Campbell Black.

In 1964, Bill Stead, a Nevada rancher, pilot, and unlimited hydroplane racing champion, organised the first Reno Air Races at a small dirt strip called the Sky Ranch, located between Sparks, Nevada, and Pyramid Lake.  The National Championship Air Races were soon moved to the Reno Stead Airport, and have been held there every September since 1966.  The five-day event attracts around 200,000 people, and includes racing around courses marked out by pylons for six classes of aircraft: Unlimited, Formula One, Sport Biplane, AT-6, Sport, and Jet.  It also features civil airshow acts, military flight demonstrations, and a large static aircraft display.  Other promoters have run pylon racing events across the US and Canada, including races in Las Vegas, NV in 1965, Lancaster, CA in 1965 and 1966, Mojave, California in 1970-71, and 1973–79; at Cape May, NJ in 1971, San Diego, CA in 1971, Miami, FL in 1973 and 1979, Moose Jaw, Saskatchewan in 1984; Hamilton Field, California, in 1988; at Dallas, TX in 1990, in Denver, CO in 1990 and 1992, in Kansas City in 1993, in Phoenix, Arizona in 1994 and 1995; and in Tunica, Mississippi in 2005.  Numerous other venues across the United States, Canada, and Mexico have also hosted events featuring the smaller Formula One and Biplane classes.

In 1970, American Formula One racing was exported to Europe (Great Britain, and then to France), where almost as many races have been held as in the U.S.A.  Also in 1970, the California 1000 Air Race started at the Mojave Airport with a 66 lap unlimited air race that featured a Douglas DC-7, with one aircraft completing the circuit.

In 2003, Red Bull created a series called the Red Bull Air Race World Championship, in which competitors flew individually between pairs of pylons, while performing prescribed manoeuvres.  Usually held over water near large cities, the sport has attracted large crowds and renewed media interest in air racing. The inaugural season had stops in Austria and Hungary. In 2019, Red Bull decided not to continue the Red Bull Air Race World Championship.

Aero GP has multiple aircraft racing together pik around pylons, and is based in Europe where it has held an air race each year since 2005.

Powered paragliding or paramotor races have been organised by the Parabatix Sky Racers made up of the world's top paramotor pilots.  The first occurring on 4 September 2010 in an airfield in Montauban, Southern France.  These are foot-launched ram-air wings powered by small two-stroke engines, and allow for much smaller race venues such as city parks or beaches, where the audience can see the pilots up close as they carry out spectacular manoeuvres swooping close to the ground-pylons during the race.

Historical championships

Active air races

Classes
Restricting aircraft to a specific type or design creates a competition that focuses on pilot skill.  Air racing events such as the Reno air races, incorporate multiple classes or aircraft.  These may be defined by the race organiser, or by a sanctioned group.  Some air races are limited to a single class.  Classes used at the Reno races are as follows:

Notable racing pilots

Antoine de Saint-Exupéry
Pancho Barnes
Lowell Bayles
André Beaumont
Péter Besenyei
Louis Bleriot
Paul Bonhomme
Alan Cobham
Jacqueline Cochran
Glenn Curtiss
Geoffrey de Havilland
Geoffrey de Havilland, Jr.
Jimmy Doolittle
Amelia Earhart
Roland Garros
Eugene Gilbert
Claude Grahame-White
Gustav Hamel
Harry Hawker
Frank Hawks
Alex Henshaw
Steve Hinton
Skip Holm
Benny Howard
Amy Johnson
Hubert Latham
Tony LeVier
Johnny Livingston
Mike Mangold
Paul Mantz
Jim Mollison
John Moisant
Blanche Noyes
Adolphe Pégoud
John Cyril Porte
C. W. A. Scott
Lyle Shelton
Thomas Sopwith
Louise Thaden
Bobbi Trout
Roscoe Turner
Jules Védrines
Jimmy Wedell
Charles Terres Weymann

Racing airplanes

Cultural depictions
Set in the 1930s, the movie Porco Rosso briefly touches on the early days of air racing.
The Rocketeer comic books feature air racing prominently as the story is set during the 1930s.
The 1965 film Those Magnificent Men in Their Flying Machines depicts a £10,000 prize air race between London and Paris.  The film takes place in 1910 and utilises many authentic reproductions of aeroplanes from that era.
The November 1981 Duran Duran single My Own Way features the opening lyric, "I saw you at the air race yesterday."
The 2013 Disney movie Planes follows the story of a cropduster who dreams of becoming an air racing champion in the global 'Wings around the Globe' race.
William Faulkner's 1935 novel Pylon, about a group of post WWI flyers turned barnstormers and air racers, and their unconventional lives set against the backdrop of a fictionalised New Orleans.  The novel was adapted by screenwriter George Zuckerman for the 1957 Douglas Sirk film The Tarnished Angels starring Rock Hudson, Robert Stack, Dorothy Malone, and Jack Carson.
The TV series Metajets is about a group of air racers in the future who fly jets as a part of an air racing organization which is their cover for their actual work as an air squadron that fights against a terrorist organization.

See also

Model aircraft#Competitions
Drone racing

Notes

References
Air Race 1 World Cup 
Ninety Nines
 Royal Aero Club Records Racing and Rally Association
100 years of air racing
Red Bull Air Race
Parabatix Sky Racers
Aero GP
Reno Air Races
Sport Air Racing League